is a 1954 Japanese drama film directed by Keisuke Kinoshita, based on the 1952 novel of the same name by Sakae Tsuboi. The film stars Hideko Takamine as a schoolteacher named Hisako Ōishi, who lives during the rise and fall of Japanese nationalism in the early Shōwa period. The narrative begins in 1928 with the teacher's first class of first grade students and follows her through 1946.

Twenty-Four Eyes was released in Japan by Shochiku on 15 September 1954, where it received generally positive reviews and commercial success. The film received a number of awards, including the Kinema Junpo "Best One" Award for 1954, as well as the Henrietta Award at the 5th Annual World Film Favorite Festival. The film has been noted for its anti-war themes. It was remade in color in 1987.

Plot

On 4 April 1928, a schoolteacher named Hisako Ōishi arrives on the island of Shōdoshima, where she will be teaching a class of first grade students from the nearby village. Because Ōishi rides a bicycle and wears a suit, the adult villagers are initially apprehensive towards her. Ōishi is introduced to her class of twelve students: Isokichi, Takeichi, Kichiji, Tadashi, Nita, Matsue, Misako, Masuno, Fujiko, Sanae, Kotoe, and Kotsuru. She teaches the children how to sing songs, and plays outside with them. Most of the children have to care for younger siblings or help their parents with farming or fishing after school.

On 1 September, the class goes to the seashore, where some of the students play a practical joke on Ōishi by causing her to fall into a hole in the sand. The fall injures one of her legs, and she takes a leave of absence. A substitute teacher takes her place, but the children are not as receptive to him as they were to Ōishi. One day after lunch, the students sneak away from their homes and journey on foot to go visit Ōishi. They spot her riding in a bus, and she invites them to her house, where they have a large meal; later, the children's parents send Ōishi gifts as thanks for treating them. Because of her injury, Ōishi is transferred from the schoolhouse to the main school, where teachers instruct students in fifth grade and above.

By 1933, Ōishi is engaged to a ship engineer, and her original students are now sixth graders. Matsue's mother gives birth to another girl but dies in the process, leaving Matsue to care for the child. Soon after, the baby dies as well, and Matsue leaves Shōdoshima. Ōishi learns that a fellow teacher, Mr. Kataoka, has been arrested on suspicion of being "a Red". Kataoka was suspected of having a copy of an anti-war anthology printed by a class taught by a friend of his in Onomichi. Ōishi notes that she shared stories from that anthology with her own students after a copy was sent to the school. The principal warns Ōishi against discussing politics with her class, and burns the anthology.

In October, Ōishi and her class take a field trip to Ritsurin Park in Takamatsu, as well as to the Konpira Shrine. Ōishi goes into town and encounters Matsue, who is now working at a restaurant as a waitress. Back at school, Ōishi has her students write down their hopes for the future; Sanae dreams of becoming a teacher, while Fujiko, whose family is impoverished, feels hopeless. Kotoe drops out of school to help her mother at home; Masuno wants to attend a conservatory, but her parents disapprove; the male students in the class want to become soldiers. Ōishi is reprimanded by the principal for not encouraging the boys in their military aspirations. Some time later, Ōishi, who is now pregnant, decides to resign from teaching.

In 1941, Ōishi visits Kotoe, who now has tuberculosis. Ōishi has given birth to three children: Daikichi, Namiki, and Yatsu. Misako has been married; Sanae is now a teacher at the main school; Kotsuru is an honors graduate in midwifery; Fujiko's family went bankrupt; Kotsuru works at a café in Kobe; Masuno works at her parents' restaurant; and the male students have all joined the military. As time passes, Ōishi's mother dies, and Ōishi's husband is killed.

On 15 August 1945, Emperor Hirohito announces the surrender of Japan at the end of World War II. Ōishi's daughter Yatsu dies after falling from a tree.

On 4 April 1946, Ōishi, now struggling financially, returns to teaching. Among the students in her new class are Makoto, the younger sister of Kotoe, who has died; Chisato, Matsue's daughter; and Katsuko, Misako's daughter. Ōishi reunites with an adult Misako, and they visit the graves of Tadashi, Takeichi, and Nita, all of whom were killed during the war. Misako, along with Sanae, Kotsuru, and Masuno, hosts a party for Ōishi at Masuno's residence. They are joined by Isokichi, who was blinded in the war, and Kichiji. The students present Ōishi with a new bicycle to ride to school.

Cast

 Hideko Takamine as Hisako Ōishi, a schoolteacher who comes to Shōdoshima to teach at a village school. Her surname Ōishi (大石) can be translated as "Big Stone"; because she is shorter in stature than their previous teacher, Ōishi's original first graders refer to her as Oishi (小石) "Miss Pebble".

Themes
American author David Desser wrote of the film that "Kinoshita desires to make the basic decency of one woman [Ōishi] stand in opposition to the entire militarist era in Japan." Japanese film theorist and historian Tadao Sato wrote that "Twenty-Four Eyes evolved to represent Japanese regrets over the wars in China and the Pacific and stood in symbolic opposition to the impending return to militarism." Sato added that the film "implies that the honest citizens of Japan were only victims of trauma and sorrow and fundamentally innocent of any culpability for the war. [...] Had the movie assigned responsibility for the war to all Japanese people, opposition would have arisen, and it might not have become such a box-office hit."

Film scholar Audie Bock referred to Twenty-Four Eyes as being "undoubtedly a woman's film, honoring the endurance and self-sacrifice of mothers and daughters trying to preserve their families", and called it "a meticulously detailed portrait of what are perceived as the best qualities in the Japanese character: humility, perseverance, honesty, love of children, love of nature, and love of peace." Bock wrote that "The resonance of Twenty-Four Eyes for audiences then and now is that Miss Oishi speaks for countless people the world over who never want to see another father, son, or brother die in a war for reasons they do not understand", and posited that the film's anti-war message is "aimed more directly at Japan" compared to films with a similar message by Yasujirō Ozu or Akira Kurosawa.

In an analysis of the film, Christopher Howard wrote: "From a feminist perspective, there is certainly great sympathy with the young girls forced out of school and into menial work by their parents [...] As a pacifist and leftist sympathizer, however, Kinoshita raises stronger political questions in an episode in which Miss Oishi displays sympathy with a fellow teacher accused of communist connections." He notes that "she even tries introducing some elements of Marxism into her class teaching. At a time in which the Japanese Teaching Union was the source of a great deal of radical activity, Twenty-Four Eyes is not the only film making the connection between teaching and left-wing thought, and a number of independent films from the period also had more sustained anti-military and communist sympathies."

Reception
Twenty-Four Eyes was a popular film in Japan upon its release in 1954.

On the review aggregator website Rotten Tomatoes, the film has an approval rating of 60% based on five reviews, with an average rating of 6.69/10. In 2006, Alan Morrison of Empire gave the film a score of four out of five stars, calling it "Sentimental but sincere." In 2008, Jamie S. Rich of DVD Talk praised the film's ensemble of child actors and its emotional weight, writing that "If you don't tear up at least a couple of times in Twenty-Four Eyes, you apparently have rocks where the rest of us have brains and hearts." Rich called the film "an effective lesson in how the hopes and dreams of our youngest citizens and the opportunities they are given to pursue them are essential to the survival of any society." Fernando F. Croche of Slant Magazine gave the film two-and-a-half out of four stars, calling it "alternately endearing and overbearing to modern eyes and ears" but "reportedly a soothing experience" for Japanese viewers still suffering from the effects of World War II when the film was released.

Home media
On 20 February 2006, Twenty-Four Eyes was released on DVD in the United Kingdom by Eureka Entertainment, as part of their Masters of Cinema line of home video releases. The Masters of Cinema release includes a gallery of production stills and a 20-page booklet containing an essay by Joan Mellen. In August 2008, the film was released on DVD by the Criterion Collection. The Criterion release includes two trailers for the film, an interview with Tadao Sato, and a 20-page booklet featuring an essay by Audie Bock and excerpts from an interview with Kinoshita.

Remake and other adaptations
A color remake of the film was directed by Yoshitaka Asama and released in 1987. The remake is known in English as Children on the Island.

Besides the movie versions, there were also TV drama recreations in 1964 (TV Tokyo), 1967 (TV Asahi), 1974 (NHK), 1976 (NHK), 1979 (TBS), 2005 (NTV), and 2013 (TV Asahi), as well as an animated version in 1980 (Fuji TV).

References

External links

 
 
 
 

1954 films
1954 drama films
Best Film Kinema Junpo Award winners
Japanese black-and-white films
Films about educators
Films based on Japanese novels
Films directed by Keisuke Kinoshita
Films set in the 1920s
Films set in the 1930s
Films set in the 1940s
Films set in Japan
Anti-war films
1950s political films
Japanese drama films
1950s Japanese-language films
Shochiku films
Films with screenplays by Keisuke Kinoshita
1950s Japanese films